Fiona Hall may refer to:

 Fiona Hall (artist) (born 1953), Australian artist
 Fiona Hall (politician) (born 1955), British member of the European Parliament